Lethal Weapon 4 is a 1998 American buddy cop action film directed and produced by Richard Donner, and starring Mel Gibson, Danny Glover, Joe Pesci, Rene Russo, Chris Rock, and Jet Li (in his international film debut). It is the fourth installment in the Lethal Weapon film series. It is the last film in the series directed by Donner before his death, and the last to be released theatrically.

A sequel titled Lethal Finale is in development for the streaming service HBO Max. Glover and Gibson will reprise their roles as Riggs and Murtaugh, with Gibson also in talks to direct.

Plot
Lorna Cole is pregnant with LAPD Sergeant Martin Riggs' baby; they are not married, but both are thinking about it. LAPD Sergeant Roger Murtaugh's daughter Rianne, is also pregnant. Due to issues with the department's insurance carrier over Riggs and Murtaugh's actions as sergeants, the Police Chief has Captain Murphy promote them to captains.

The officers, along with Leo Getz, come upon a Chinese immigrant smuggling ring after running an ocean-going vessel aground, though the captain of the boat escapes. In the subsequent investigation, Murtaugh finds the Hong family hiding from US Immigration officers to avoid deportation. Murtaugh offers them shelter in his home, and their families, along with Riggs and Cole, quickly bond. Grandfather Hong reveals he is looking for his uncle, a skilled engraver, who had paid for their passage to the United States. Riggs discovers through Lorna that the father of Rianne's unborn child is Detective Lee Butters. The family is hiding this from Murtaugh, as he would not approve of his daughter being with a police officer.

Continued investigation of the smuggling ring leads the officers to "Uncle" Benny Chan, a crime boss operating from a Chinatown restaurant. There, they are introduced to high-ranking Triad negotiator Wah Sing Ku. Chan forces them out of his restaurant when the officers show no probable cause. Riggs pulls the fire alarm so that the sprinklers go off, forcing all the restaurant customers to flee.  Outside, Riggs spots the escaped ship captain and tries to give chase but fails to capture him. However, Ku later intercepts the captain and kills him as punishment for attracting the police's attention. Chan and Ku take steps to eliminate all those in on their plans.

Hong is able to contact his uncle, but this leads the Triads to Murtaugh's house. Ku and the Triad thugs kidnap the Hongs, tie up Murtaugh, his family, Riggs and Cole and set the house ablaze. Ping, Hong's grandson, has evaded capture and helps to free the others in time. Though Riggs and Murtaugh chase down and kill some of the Triad members, Ku escapes. Ku brings Mr. Hong to his uncle at a warehouse, where he has been engraving plates for a counterfeiting operation for Ku and Chan in exchange for transit for his family. Ku kills Hong in front of his uncle to assure his continued work.

With Getz serving as a distraction, the officers confront Chan at his dentist's office to interrogate him with laughing gas for more information but are unable to get any leads, and during which Riggs and Butters accidentally reveal the family secret to Murtaugh. Later, as they discuss what they know with Detective Ng, who has worked on cases involving the Chinese government before, Ng recognizes that Ku must be trying to negotiate with a corrupt Chinese general for the release of the Four Fathers, high-ranking Triad members that include Ku's brother. New information leads them to the abandoned warehouse where they find the bodies of Hong, his uncle, and Chan, the latter two killed by Ku after they served their usefulness. Knowing that Ku plans to use counterfeit money, the police intercept the exchange between Ku and the general, telling the general that the money is fake. The enraged general reacts by executing most of the Four Fathers before being shot and killed by the Triads, at which a firefight breaks out between the Triad, the general's private army and the police, and most of the Triad and army are killed; and Butters is wounded shielding Murtaugh. Ku attempts to escape with his brother, but his brother is shot and killed by Murtaugh. Riggs and Murtaugh pursue Ku to a pier where they engage him in a brutal fistfight. Murtaugh impales Ku through the stomach with a rebar before being knocked out by Ku, after which the pier collapses and sends Riggs and Ku into the water. Riggs is able to find a Kalashnikov assault rifle and finish off Ku, while Murtaugh recovers in time to rescue Riggs from a piece of concrete that had pinned him underwater.

Later, Riggs visits his dead wife's grave and asks her for advice about his impending marriage with Lorna, about which he still has doubts; Getz arrives and offers a heartfelt childhood story that gives Riggs both a new light on the situation and a new perspective of Getz. They soon discover Lorna is about to give birth and race to the hospital, where Riggs and Lorna are ceremonially married by a rabbi just before she enters labor. Their son and Rianne's daughter are born, and Murtaugh accepts Butters as his son-in-law. Murphy gives Riggs and Murtaugh their rank of sergeant back since the city is insured again and Hong's family is granted asylum.

Cast

Production
In early 1993, a year after the release and big success of Lethal Weapon 3, Warner Bros. and producer Joel Silver tried buying new spec script by Jonathan Hensleigh titled Simon Says, which was about police detective and shop owner who are forced by mad bomber to search and stop the bombs he planted all over the city, as part of his revenge plan against the detective. Silver and Warner Bros. wanted to get the script and re-write it into Lethal Weapon 4. 

However 20th Century Fox bought the script instead and originally they planned for it to be Brandon Lee's next film after The Crow or have it be re-written into sequel to his previous action film, Rapid Fire. But after Lee's death during filming of The Crow, Fox instead took Simon Says script and used it for third Die Hard film they had trouble developing at the time, and after many re-writes done by several writers, it was finally made into Die Hard With a Vengeance (1995). 

In July 1993,  Warner Bros. and Silver started working on not just the fourth film, but the fifth one as well. Screenwriter and script doctor Jonathan Lemkin, who has just done some uncredited work for them on Demolition Man (1993), was hired to write the script for Lethal Weapon 4 while another writer wrote the script for Lethal Weapon 5. According to Silver, originally it was planned to film both films back-to-back, or use best parts from both scripts into one film.
 

In June 1994, Richard Donner was planning on making both fourth and fifth film, however when asked about those in an interview at the time, Mel Gibson said how while they did have two scripts ready, he wasn't interested in doing any more Lethal Weapon sequels.

Between late 1994 and early 1995, screenwriter Jeffrey Boam, who did some uncredited work on first Lethal Weapon (1987), re-wrote original Play Dirty script for Lethal Weapon 2 by Shane Black and Warren Murphy, and wrote the story and script for Lethal Weapon 3, was brought in to re-write Lethal Weapon 4 script which Warner Bros. were going to use for the film, but Boam had some problems with it, and he also wasn't sure about working on another Lethal Weapon film after bad experience he had with last film, like having to keep re-writing it during filming and even getting fired at one point only to be re-hired later. Then later on he started working on his own new story for Lethal Weapon 4, which would have Riggs and Murtaugh fighting against neo-nazi survivalists who are committing terrorist attacks on L.A., like using Stinger missiles to try and shoot down the jet carrying Los Angeles Lakers. Boam wrote the first version of the script in January 1995, and he said in an interview how he would probably have to write at least three more drafts. By October 1995, Boam was still working on the script, and at the same time he was also working on fourth Indiana Jones film which was left unproduced.

The book The Gross: The Hits, The Flops: The Summer That Ate Hollywood by Peter Bart, went into lot of details regarding the film's troubled production, from writing to release. While Boam was still working on his version of the story for Lethal Weapon 4 about neo-nazi survialists, other writers were writing their own versions, all of which were rejected. Finally, Warner Bros. decided that they wanted for fourth film to focus on storyline involving Triads, so despite them and many other people really liking Boam's version and how he went back to the serious, darker and edgier tone of first film, it was rejected for those reasons. Boam would later say how he felt that the main plot Warner Bros. went with in final film about counterfeiting of Chinese money wasn't good or suspenseful enough plot for Lethal Weapon sequel.

Jonathan Lemkin was once again brought in to write the first version of the script involving Triads, about four years after he wrote his first rejected version of Lethal Weapon 4 script in 1993, and although his new script was received very positively, once again other writers were brought in to write other versions of the story. Alfred Gough and Miles Millar wrote one of the unused scripts, but for some reason they still have story credit in the film.

Joel Silver brought in TV writer Channing Gibson to work on the script, after he was impressed by Gibson's re-write of 1993 spec script by another screenwriter Steven Maeda titled Sandblast, an action adventure thriller described as "Die Hard (1988) meets Cliffhanger (1993) in a sandstorm", about ex-specialist who's also explosives expert leading the commando team into Iraq desert wasteland to search and recover lost nuclear warheads before traitorous team of green berets finds them first, and while dealing with deadly terrain and huge sandstorm. Sandblast was another Warner Bros. project on which Silver worked as producer between 1995 and 1996 when it was in production, and originally Eddie Murphy was going to star in completely serious action role, but after he left, Wesley Snipes was cast in the lead and for $10 million paycheck, and Jean-Claude Van Damme was going to play the main villain, however despite it having about $42 million budget and going into pre-production with cast and crew ready to start working in Morocco where sets were already built, Sandblast was cancelled in 1996 due to several different problems, and due to his "pay or play" deal, Snipes instead starred in Murder at 1600 (1997).

Gibson took the job of writing Lethal Weapon 4 mostly because he thought it would be more relaxed writing job than anything he did for TV, however much like what happened on previous two sequels, the script kept getting changed and re-written over and over again, and Gibson ended up doing more work and revisions on it than on all of his TV work put together. Production even started without half of the script finished, and ending wasn't written until it was finally time to film it.

Leo Getz and Lee Butters weren't in original scripts, but then Joe Pesci was hired and paid $1 million for three weeks of work, and Gibson was "three-fourths" through his newest draft when Chris Rock was hired, which forced him to re-write the script yet again. Butters was originally written to be a gay detective, but immediately when they started filming police station scene between him, Riggs, Murtaugh and Leo, everyone felt how his character didn't work so he was changed and re-written to be Rianne's husband, although they only share one scene in the final film and never say anything to each other, due to last minute changes made on his character.

Besides Lemkin, Gibson, Gough and Millar, some other writers did uncredited work on the script, including Michael Curtis, Greg Malins, Fred Dekker (who came up with the scene where Riggs and Murtaugh drive their car off the freeway and through the building), and even Boam was brought in to work on the script.

The film entered production inearly January 1998 and with already planned summer release of that same year, but due to issues during filming including the script changes, production ended around mid May, less than two months before its scheduled July release. Editors had to work very quickly to have the film ready, which is why the trailers for it show some deleted and alternate scenes which are not in the film. But despite this, the film was finished and released as planned.

Release

Box office
Lethal Weapon 4 debuted at  1 at the box office with $34.05 million. Although the film grossed $130 million in the U.S., it was not considered a runaway financial success as the previous three films had been. 

Shooting began in January 1998, just months before the film's release, with a production budget estimated at $120–$150 million (although Warner Bros. maintained it cost less than $100 million) and an additional $50 million spent on marketing and distribution. This made the fourth film the most expensive entry of the series. Its profit margin was saved in part due to the combined foreign box office sales making the film gross approximately $285 million in total, making the second highest-grossing film in the Lethal Weapon film series behind, Lethal Weapon 3 (1992). Still, like its predecessors, Lethal Weapon 4 was among the top ten grossing films of its release year.

Reception
Critical reaction to Lethal Weapon 4 was mixed. The film currently holds a rating of 53% on Rotten Tomatoes based on reviews from 69 critics, and an average rating of 6.4 out of 10. The site's consensus states: "Jet Li's arrival breathes fresh life into a tired franchise formula -- but not enough to put Lethal Weapon 4 on equal footing with its predecessors." Metacritic, which assigns a normalized rating of 0-100 from mainstream critics, calculated a score of 37 out of 100 based on reviews from 21 critics, which means it has an indication of "generally unfavorable reviews". Audiences polled by CinemaScore gave the film an average grade of "A−" on an A+ to F scale.

James Berardinelli gave the film three stars out of four, writing: "Given the expectations that constrain it, Lethal Weapon 4 is probably the best motion picture that could possibly result from another teaming of Martin Riggs and Roger Murtaugh. The series has lost a lot of steam since the first two entries, and, although the fourth movie ratchets up the energy level from the moribund state of the disappointing Lethal Weapon 3, there's no sense of spontaneity." 

Roger Ebert gave Lethal Weapon 4 two stars out of four, writing: "Lethal Weapon 4 has all the technical skill of the first three movies in the series, but lacks the secret weapon, which was conviction. All four movies take two cop buddies and put them into spectacular and absurd action sequences, but the first three at least went through the motions of taking the plot seriously (and the first one did such a good job, it made my 'best 10' list of that year). This time, we're watching an exercise."  

Michael O'Sullivan of The Washington Post called it a "stupid and violent delicacy" that balances a "patented blend of high action and low comedy".

The film was nominated for a Razzie Award for Worst Supporting Actor for Pesci.

Home media
Lethal Weapon 4 has been released on VHS and DVD numerous times. It has been re-released in numerous sets that contain all four films in the series. Lethal Weapon 4 was released on Blu-ray Disc as part of a box set with the additional Lethal Weapon films on May 22, 2012.

Soundtrack
The film's music was composed by Michael Kamen, Eric Clapton, and David Sanborn. This was the only film in the series not to have a soundtrack album released alongside it, but in 2013 La-La Land Records released the score as discs seven and eight of its limited edition Lethal Weapon Soundtrack Collection.

Sequel
There had long been talk of a fifth Lethal Weapon film, although both Mel Gibson and Danny Glover had initially expressed a lack of interest. In 2007, Moviehole.net received word from sources that Warner Bros. were in the early stages of trying to relaunch the Lethal Weapon series sometime in 2009 or later. A spec script treatment was written by Shane Black and Chuck Mondry, leading to rumors that the sequel was on fast track by Warner Bros. with Black in the director's chair. In 2008, Richard Donner said, "Mel turned it down. I would like to think that Mel turned it down because I wasn't involved." Donner said that he and Lethal Weapon 4 writer Channing Gibson "had an incredibly strong story for the fifth movie" but that the studio had opted to work with Joel Silver instead.

In November 2017, Mel Gibson hinted that a fifth movie might happen and that he, Richard Donner, and Danny Glover have discussed the idea to return. In December 2017, Donner confirmed in an interview on the Spocklight podcast that Gibson and Glover have agreed to return as Riggs and Murtaugh respectively and that he has a story all set. The only obstacle is Warner Bros. greenlighting the film. Channing Gibson remains involved as screenwriter. The story will take place in present-day and is intended to be the final film in the series. In February 2018, Donner revealed the film's official title to be Lethal Finale; while also stating that the film is being held up by the production company and story. In January 2020, producer Dan Lin confirmed that Lethal Weapon 5 is in active development, with Mel Gibson and Danny Glover confirmed to return, and Richard Donner returning to direct, but that a script had not yet been finalized. In December 2020, Richard Donner confirmed that he was developing the sequel and would produce and direct it, adding that it would be the last film he directs. However, Donner died on July 5, 2021, leaving the fate of the film unknown. Mel Gibson has been approached for potentially directing the film.

On November 15, 2021, Gibson confirmed that he is in talks to direct and star in the fifth Lethal Weapon film, saying that he would be helming the film to honor Donner. It was also revealed that Richard Wenk (The Equalizer,  Jack Reacher: Never Go Back) had drafted a screenplay. The production will be exclusive to HBO Max with no theatrical release.

References

External links

 
 
 
 

1998 films
1998 action thriller films
1990s buddy comedy films
1998 martial arts films
American action comedy films
American action thriller films
American buddy cop films
American buddy comedy films
American comedy thriller films
American martial arts films
American sequel films
Cantonese-language films
1990s English-language films
Fictional portrayals of the Los Angeles Police Department
Films scored by Eric Clapton
Films scored by Michael Kamen
Films about human trafficking
Films about immigration
Films directed by Richard Donner
Films produced by Joel Silver
Films set in Los Angeles
Films shot in California
Lethal Weapon (franchise)
Mandarin-language films
American police detective films
American pregnancy films
Silver Pictures films
Triad films
Films about United States Army Special Forces
Warner Bros. films
1990s buddy cop films
1998 action comedy films
1998 comedy films
1990s American films